Balaton wine region is one of the seven larger wine regions of Hungary. It consists of six wine regions: Badacsony, Balatonboglár, Balaton-felvidék, Balatonfüred-Csopak, Nagy-Somló and Zala. Its wine regions are spread around Lake Balaton; with these areas having constituted one single wine region back to the 19th century. Wine production was started at the beginning of the 1st century by the Romans. The region is known for its specific white wines showing local particularities; its most widely grown variety is olaszrizling.

Wine regions

References 

Wine regions of Hungary
Wineregion